This is a list of law schools in Sweden.

Master of Laws (Juristprogrammet):
Uppsala University
Lund University
Stockholm University
Göteborg University
Umeå University
Örebro University
Karlstad University

Other educations in law:
Linköping University (program in business law ("affärsjuridik"); not fully licensed for the full law degree program)

Education in Sweden
Sweden
Law schools